The 2018 Liga 3 Banten is a qualifying round for the national round of 2018 Liga 3. Persitangsel South Tangerang, the winner of the 2017 Liga 3 Banten are the defending champions. The competition will begin on June 27, 2018.

The 9 probable teams to compete are mentioned below.
This stage scheduled starts on 27 Jule 2018.

First round

Group A

Group B

Second round

Group C

References 

 

Liga Nusantara
3